Columbia was a provincial electoral district in the Canadian province of British Columbia.  It made its first appearance on the hustings in the election of 1903. It lasted until the 1928 election, when it was merged into Columbia-Revelstoke for the 1933 election.  Following the election the new Pattullo government moved to reestablish Columbia as a separate riding, and former MLA Thomas King was elected by acclamation in a 1934 by election.

In 1966 the riding was renamed Columbia River. This riding was later merged with the Revelstoke riding to become Columbia River-Revelstoke, the current riding for the western part of the area. The eastern part of the riding is now part of East Kootenay.

For other current and historical electoral districts in the Kootenay region, please see Kootenay (electoral districts).

Demographics

Political geography

Notable elections

Notable MLAs

Electoral history 
Note:  Winners of each election are in bold.

|Liberal
|Wilmer Cleveland Wells
|align="right"|Accl. 	
|align="right"| -.-%
|align="right"|
|align="right"|unknown
|- bgcolor="white"
!align="right" colspan=3|Total valid votes
!align="right"|n/a 	
!align="right"|-.-%
!align="right"|
|- bgcolor="white"
!align="right" colspan=3|Total rejected ballots
!align="right"|
!align="right"|
!align="right"|
|- bgcolor="white"
!align="right" colspan=3|Turnout
!align="right"|%
!align="right"|
!align="right"|
|}

|- bgcolor="white"
!align="right" colspan=3|Total valid votes
!align="right"|449
!align="right"|100.00%
!align="right"|
|- bgcolor="white"
!align="right" colspan=3|Total rejected ballots
!align="right"|
!align="right"|
!align="right"|
|- bgcolor="white"
!align="right" colspan=3|Turnout
!align="right"|%
!align="right"|
!align="right"|
|}	

|- bgcolor="white"
!align="right" colspan=3|Total valid votes
!align="right"|507
!align="right"|100.00%
!align="right"|
|- bgcolor="white"
!align="right" colspan=3|Total rejected ballots
!align="right"|
!align="right"|
!align="right"|
|- bgcolor="white"
!align="right" colspan=3|Turnout
!align="right"|%
!align="right"|
!align="right"|
|}

|- bgcolor="white"
!align="right" colspan=3|Total valid votes
!align="right"|545 	
!align="right"|100.00%
|- bgcolor="white"
!align="right" colspan=7|1  When he failed to obtain the official nomination, Forster ran as an Independent Conservative but in full support of the McBride government.
|}	

 
|Liberal
|John Andrew Buckham 
|align="right"|541
|align="right"|66.63%
|align="right"|
|align="right"|unknown

|- bgcolor="white"
!align="right" colspan=3|Total valid votes
!align="right"|812 	
!align="right"|100.00%
!align="right"|
|- bgcolor="white"
!align="right" colspan=3|Total rejected ballots
!align="right"|
!align="right"|
!align="right"|
|- bgcolor="white"
!align="right" colspan=3|Turnout
!align="right"|%
!align="right"|
!align="right"|
|- bgcolor="white"
|}

 
|Liberal
|John Andrew Buckham 
|align="right"|584
|align="right"|60.58%
|align="right"|
|align="right"|unknown

|- bgcolor="white"
!align="right" colspan=3|Total valid votes
!align="right"|964 	
!align="right"|100.00%
!align="right"|
|- bgcolor="white"
!align="right" colspan=3|Total rejected ballots
!align="right"|
!align="right"|
!align="right"|
|- bgcolor="white"
!align="right" colspan=3|Turnout
!align="right"|%
!align="right"|
!align="right"|
|}

 
|Liberal
|John Andrew Buckham 
|align="right"|644
|align="right"|56.84%
|align="right"|
|align="right"|unknown

|- bgcolor="white"
!align="right" colspan=3|Total valid votes
!align="right"|1,133  	
!align="right"|100.00%
!align="right"|
|- bgcolor="white"
!align="right" colspan=3|Total rejected ballots
!align="right"|
!align="right"|
!align="right"|
|- bgcolor="white"
!align="right" colspan=3|Turnout
!align="right"|%
!align="right"|
!align="right"|
|}  	

 
|Liberal
|John Andrew Buckham 
|align="right"|659
|align="right"|50.23%
|align="right"|
|align="right"|unknown

|Independent
|Gladys Elspeth Cross
|align="right"|26 		 	 	 	
|align="right"|1.98%
|align="right"|
|align="right"|unknown

|- bgcolor="white"
!align="right" colspan=3|Total valid votes
!align="right"|1,312 	
!align="right"|100.00%
!align="right"|
|- bgcolor="white"
!align="right" colspan=3|Total rejected ballots
!align="right"|23
!align="right"|
!align="right"|
|- bgcolor="white"
!align="right" colspan=3|Turnout
!align="right"|%
!align="right"|
!align="right"|
|}

After the 1928 election, there was a redistribution.  The Columbia riding was merged with the Revelstoke riding into Columbia-Revelstoke, which first appeared only in the 1933 general election.  For the 1937 election, the riding name "Columbia" was re-established.

 
|Liberal
|Thomas King 
|align="right"|921
|align="right"|57.06%
|align="right"|
|align="right"|unknown
 
|Co-operative Commonwealth Fed.
|William Henry Tallis
|align="right"|322 			
|align="right"|19.95%
|align="right"|
|align="right"|unknown
|- bgcolor="white"
!align="right" colspan=3|Total valid votes
!align="right"|1,614
!align="right"|100.00%
!align="right"|
|- bgcolor="white"
!align="right" colspan=3|Total rejected ballots
!align="right"|39
!align="right"|
!align="right"|
|- bgcolor="white"
!align="right" colspan=3|Turnout
!align="right"|%
!align="right"|
!align="right"|
|}

 
|Liberal
|Thomas King 
|align="right"|648
|align="right"|42.66%
|align="right"|
|align="right"|unknown
 
|Co-operative Commonwealth Fed.
|James Herbert Mathews
|align="right"|487 	 			
|align="right"|32.06%
|align="right"|
|align="right"|unknown
|- bgcolor="white"
!align="right" colspan=3|Total valid votes
!align="right"|1,519 
!align="right"|100.00%
!align="right"|
|- bgcolor="white"
!align="right" colspan=3|Total rejected ballots
!align="right"|9
!align="right"|
!align="right"|
|- bgcolor="white"
!align="right" colspan=3|Turnout
!align="right"|%
!align="right"|
!align="right"|
|}

 
|Co-operative Commonwealth Fed.
|Thomas James Alton
|align="right"|588 				 	 	 	
|align="right"|46.70%
|align="right"|
|align="right"|unknown

|- bgcolor="white"
!align="right" colspan=3|Total valid votes
!align="right"|1,259 
!align="right"|100.00%
!align="right"|
|- bgcolor="white"
!align="right" colspan=3|Total rejected ballots
!align="right"|24
!align="right"|
!align="right"|
|- bgcolor="white"
!align="right" colspan=3|Turnout
!align="right"|%
!align="right"|
!align="right"|
|}

 
|Co-operative Commonwealth Fed.
|Thomas James Alton
|align="right"|581 	 				 	 	 	
|align="right"|31.09%
|align="right"|
|align="right"|unknown

|- bgcolor="white"
!align="right" colspan=3|Total valid votes
!align="right"|1,869 
!align="right"|100.00%
!align="right"|
|- bgcolor="white"
!align="right" colspan=3|Total rejected ballots
!align="right"|24
!align="right"|
!align="right"|
|- bgcolor="white"
!align="right" colspan=3|Turnout
!align="right"|%
!align="right"|
!align="right"|
|}		

 
|Liberal
|Vaughn Stanley Kimpton
|align="right"|649        	 	 	 		
|align="right"|29.30%
|align="right"|860
|align="right"|42.28%
|align="right"|
|align="right"|unknown
 
|Co-operative Commonwealth Fed.
|Chris Madson
|align="right"|365 
|align="right"|16.48%
|align="right"|
|align="right"|
|align="right"|
|align="right"|unknown
 
|B.C. Social Credit League
|Richard Orr Newton
|align="right"|841       	 	 	
|align="right"|37.97%
|align="right"|1,174 
|align="right"|57.72%
|align="right"|
|align="right"|unknown
 
|Progressive Conservative
|Edward Jefferson Zinkan
|align="right"|360   			 	 	 	
|align="right"|16.25%
|align="right"|
|align="right"|
|align="right"|
|align="right"|unknown
|- bgcolor="white"
!align="right" colspan=3|Total valid votes
!align="right"|2,215   
!align="right"|100.00%
!align="right"|2,034
|align="right"|
|align="right"|
|- bgcolor="white"
!align="right" colspan=3|Total rejected ballots
!align="right"|101
!align="right"|
!align="right"|
|align="right"|
|align="right"|
|- bgcolor="white"
!align="right" colspan=3|Turnout
!align="right"|%
!align="right"|
!align="right"|
|align="right"|
|align="right"|
|- bgcolor="white"
!align="right" colspan=7|2  Preferential ballot.  First and final counts of three only shown.
|}

 
|Co-operative Commonwealth Fed.
|Eileen Catherine Madson
|align="right"|481 	
|align="right"|22.26%
|align="right"|
|align="right"|
|align="right"|
|align="right"|unknown
 
|Liberal
|Henry Headley Moore
|align="right"|676	 	       	 	 	 		
|align="right"|31.28%
|align="right"|787
|align="right"|43.12%
|align="right"|
|align="right"|unknown
 
|B.C. Social Credit League
|Richard Orr Newton
|align="right"|924 	 	
|align="right"|42.76%
|align="right"|1,038 
|align="right"|56.88%
|align="right"|
|align="right"|unknown
 
|Progressive Conservative
|Edward Jefferson Zinkan
|align="right"|80 	  			 	 	 	
|align="right"|3.70%
|align="right"| - 
|align="right"| -.- %
|align="right"|
|align="right"|unknown
|- bgcolor="white"
!align="right" colspan=3|Total valid votes
!align="right"|2,161 	
!align="right"|100.00%
!align="right"|1,825 
|align="right"|
|align="right"|
|- bgcolor="white"
!align="right" colspan=3|Total rejected ballots
!align="right"|105
!align="right"|
!align="right"|
|align="right"|
|align="right"|
|- bgcolor="white"
!align="right" colspan=3|Turnout
!align="right"|%
!align="right"|
!align="right"|
|align="right"|
|align="right"|
|- bgcolor="white"
!align="right" colspan=7|3  Preferential ballot.  First and final counts of three only shown.
|}

 
|Co-operative Commonwealth Fed.
|Chris Madson
|align="right"|248 	 	 			
|align="right"|12.56%
|align="right"|
|align="right"|unknown

|- bgcolor="white"
!align="right" colspan=3|Total valid votes
!align="right"|1,974 	
!align="right"|100.00%
!align="right"|
|- bgcolor="white"
!align="right" colspan=3|Total rejected ballots
!align="right"|20
!align="right"|
!align="right"|
|- bgcolor="white"
!align="right" colspan=3|Turnout
!align="right"|%
!align="right"|
!align="right"|
|}

 
|Co-operative Commonwealth Fed.
|Robert Beverly Harris
|align="right"|775 		 			
|align="right"|29.43%
|align="right"|
|align="right"|unknown

 
|Progressive Conservative
|Gordon Truls Rad
|align="right"|150 	 			 	 	 	
|align="right"|5.70%
|align="right"|
|align="right"|unknown
|- bgcolor="white"
!align="right" colspan=3|Total valid votes
!align="right"|2,633 
!align="right"|100.00%
!align="right"|
|- bgcolor="white"
!align="right" colspan=3|Total rejected ballots
!align="right"|88
!align="right"|
!align="right"|
|- bgcolor="white"
!align="right" colspan=3|Turnout
!align="right"|%
!align="right"|
!align="right"|
|}

 
|Progressive Conservative
|Alvin Walter Jo
|align="right"|1,092 		 			 	 	 	
|align="right"|33.54%
|align="right"|
|align="right"|unknown
|- bgcolor="white"
!align="right" colspan=3|Total valid votes
!align="right"|3,256 
!align="right"|100.00%
!align="right"|
|- bgcolor="white"
!align="right" colspan=3|Total rejected ballots
!align="right"|41
!align="right"|
!align="right"|
|- bgcolor="white"
!align="right" colspan=3|Turnout
!align="right"|%
!align="right"|
!align="right"|
|}

The riding was redistributed after the 1963 election.  In 1966, it was succeeded by the Columbia River riding.

Sources 

Elections BC Historical Returns

Former provincial electoral districts of British Columbia